Victor Holmberg (born 28 April 1987), know professionally as 1987, is a producer, songwriter and musician of solo projects. He is also a member of the Swedish electronic music duo Montauk.

Biography
In September 2013, 1987 released his debut single, "Ocean".

Discography

Albums
 Härskarkonst (2015)

Singles
 "Bomb" (2014) 
 "Michelle" (2014) 
 "Ocean" (2013) 
"Hej då" (2015)

Remixes
 Tove Styrke – "Ego" (1987 Remix) 
 Alice Boman – "Waiting" (1987 Remix) 
 Marlene – "Bon Voyage" (1987 Remix) 
 Lucas Nord feat. Emil Heró – "Feelings for You" (1987 Remix) 
 Wild at Heart – "Saving All My Tears" (1987 Remix) 
 Postiljonen – "All That We Had Is Lost" (1987 Remix) 
 Attu – "Don't Sleep" (1987 Remix) 
 Sportsman – "Usher" (1987 Remix) 
 SomethingALaMode feat. DWNTWN – "On My Mind" (1987 Remix)

As producer
 Montauk - The Newsroom EP, (Brilliantine, 2011) 
 Sportsman - Usher EP, (Best Fit Recordings, 2013)

References

External links
 
 
 
 
 

1987 births
21st-century Swedish singers
Swedish pop musicians
Living people
Musicians from Stockholm
Swedish electronic musicians
Swedish pianists
Swedish male singer-songwriters
Swedish-language singers
Male pianists
21st-century pianists
21st-century Swedish male singers
Parlophone artists